Ara Güler Museum is a photography museum in Istanbul, Turkey, exhibiting photographs taken by the photojournalist Ara Güler. Established in 2018, the museum also houses an archive of his work.

Ara Güler Museum was opened on 16 August 2018, on the 90th birthday of the photojournalist Ara Güler, and is located at Bomontiada in Şişli district of Istanbul, Turkey. The museum's foundation goes back to the collaboration of Doğuş Group with Ara Güler in 2016. The opening exhibition featured under the title "The Whistling Man" ("Islık Çalan Adam"). Güler's photographs focus on humans, Istanbul, and Turkey in the second half of the 20th century which shaped the individual and social memory of this location. 

The museum houses also an archive and research center ("Ara Güler Arşiv ve Araştırma Merkezi", AGAVAM). An archive team led by an art consultant at Doğuş Group carried out a two-year project on the classification, inventory, preservation, digitization and indexing of hundreds of thousands of Ara Güler's works. The archive collections are available to photography enthusiasts and researchers through a portal. 

Ara Güler (16 August 1928 – 17 October 2018) was a notable Armenian-Turkish photojournalist, nicknamed "the Eye of Istanbul" or "the Photographer of Istanbul".

Admission to the museum is free of charge.

See also
 List of museums devoted to one photographer

References

2018 establishments in Turkey
Art museums established in 2018
Photography museums and galleries in Turkey
Art museums and galleries in Istanbul
Şişli